A leadership election was held within the Czech Social Democratic Party (ČSSD) on 7 April 1991. Jiří Horák was reelected leader of the ČSSD when he defeated Albert Černý. Horák received 260 of the 358 votes.

References

Czech Social Democratic Party leadership elections
Social Democratic Party leadership election
Indirect elections
Czech Social Democratic Party leadership election]
Czech Social Democratic Party leadership election